Tony Martinsson (born 27 November 1966) is a Swedish former footballer and coach. He played for IFK Norrköping in 1989, when they became Swedish champions. After his career he took over as the coach of IF Sylvia. He has worked as director of IFK Norrköping's youth academy.

References

External links
 Ett nytt IFK-kapitel för Martinsson
 Tony Martinsson / IFK Norrköping

Living people
1966 births
Association football midfielders
Swedish footballers
Allsvenskan players
IFK Norrköping players